Eva-Marie Gunilla Håkansson (born 7 October 1960 in Ljungby, Kronoberg) is a former Swedish Olympic swimmer. She competed in relay and breaststroke events in the 1980 Summer Olympics and in the 1984 Summer Olympics.

Clubs
Kristianstads SLS

References
 

1960 births
Swedish female breaststroke swimmers
Living people
Swimmers at the 1980 Summer Olympics
Swimmers at the 1984 Summer Olympics
Olympic swimmers of Sweden
European Aquatics Championships medalists in swimming
20th-century Swedish women